Five World Trade Center (5 WTC), building 5 of the original World Trade Center in New York City, was completed in 1972 at a height of . It was heavily damaged in the September 11 attacks by the collapse of the Twin Towers and was eventually demolished in December 2001.

The following is a list of tenants of 5 WTC prior to its destruction:

The Satellite Airlines Counter, in the Plaza Level, was a retail space where airlines would lease out "booths" to house airline services. Tenants included Delta Air Lines, United Airlines, Inc., US Airways, and many others. Courier tenants included FedEx Corporation and DHL. The space was located adjacent to the lower floor of the three-floor Borders Bookstore.

References

External links
 Tenant list on cnn.com
 Verified lists on unblinking.com

World Trade Center
Lists of companies based in New York (state)
Manhattan-related lists
Five